The 2022 Holland Ladies Tour, also known as the 2022 Simac Ladies Tour is a road cycling stage race that will take place in the Netherlands between 30 August and 4 September 2022. It is the 24th edition of the Holland Ladies Tour, and part of the 2022 UCI Women's World Tour.

Teams 
11 of 14 UCI Women's WorldTeams and five UCI Women's Continental Teams made up the sixteen teams that participated the race.

UCI Women's WorldTeams

 
 
 
 
 
 
 
 
 
 
 

UCI Women's Continental Teams

Route

Stages

Stage 1 
 30 August 2022 – Lelystad to Lelystad,

Stage 2
 31 August 2022 – Ede to Ede,

Stage 3
 1 September 2022 – Gennep to Gennep,

Stage 4
 2 September 2022 – Landgraaf to Landgraaf,

Stage 5
 3 September 2022 – Sittard-Geleen to Beekdaelen,

Stage 6
 4 September 2022 – Arnhem to Arnhem,

Classification leadership table

References

External links 
  with the full 

Holland Ladies Tour
Holland Ladies Tour
Holland Ladies Tour